Keram Rural LLG is a local-level government (LLG) of East Sepik Province, Papua New Guinea.

Wards
01. Chimundo
02. Kambot
03. Kambot
04. Kambot
05. Bobten
06. Korokopa
07. Pusyten
08. Kekten
09. Buten
10. Yemen
11. Manu
12. Kambugu
13. Pamban
14. Bopaten
15. Langam (Langam language speakers)
16. Mongol (Mongol language (New Guinea) speakers)
17. Wom (Wom language (Papua New Guinea) speakers)
18. Raten
19. Ketro/Samban
20. Baniamta
21. Kamen
22. Marua
23. Yanboe
24. Nainten
25. Yar
26. Bagaram
27. Kivim
28. Longwuk
29. Mungum
30. Mingnias
31. Togo
32. Monjito
33. Likan
34. Klorowom
35. Sori
36. Paniten
37. Pataka
38. Mui

See also
Keram languages
Keram River

References

Local-level governments of East Sepik Province